Salamander: A Miscellany of Poetry was an anthology of poetry published by George Allen and Unwin in 1947 and featuring the work of many of the Cairo poets.  It was edited by Keith Bullen and John Cromer.  The title alluded to the rebirth of culture from the ashes of World War II.  It put itself forward as "a microcosm of world literature," but the sympathies of the editors were Georgian and Kiplingesque, and the aim of the Salamander Group was "to memorialize the soldier as amateur poet and oral historian."

Work by G. S. Fraser, Alan Rook, John Gawsworth and John Waller, as well as Bullen and Cromer, was published in Salamander.

References
Rawlinson, Mark, British Writing of the 2nd World War, Oxford University Press, 2000.  (see page 114)
 The Cambridge History of Twentieth-Century English Literature
Bowen, Roger, Many Histories Deep: The 'Personal Landscape' Poets in Egypt, 1940 – 1945, Associated University Presses, London, 1995.

Notes
 John Cromer, in the introduction.
 Cambridge History, page 425.
 Bowen, op. cit. page 47

External links
Salamander Oasis Trust — including brief historical note

1947 poems
Poetry anthologies
20th-century British literature
British poetry
20th-century poetry